Bishkazi (Bişkäzä) is a rural locality (a selo) in Dmitriyevsky Selsoviet, Chishminsky District, Bashkortostan, Russia. The population was 285 as of 2010. There are 7 streets.

Geography 
Bishkazi is located 31 km north of Chishmy (the district's administrative centre) by road. Vostochny is the nearest rural locality.

References 

Rural localities in Chishminsky District